EC Bell (born February 9, 1946) is an American expressionist painter and successful gallery owner from Charleston, South Carolina. In his prolific career he has completed a provocative body of work that ranges from abstract to representational and celebrates every facet of the female body.

Bell's favorite subject is the female body and land around his former home of Charleston, South Carolina, and those near his current home in the Mexican state of Guanajuato.

Childhood and early career 
The youngest of five children of Elwood Bell and Lily Benson, Elwood Cranmer Bell Jr. was born in Wilmington, North Carolina. He began painting at an early age and was commissioned for his first portrait at 11 years old. In 1966, at age 19, he enlisted in the Army. EC Bell attended the University of North Carolina and studied art under Claude Howell, Jack Berkman and with Roy Schmultz in Kaiserslautern where he was influenced by German Expressionism.

Mature career 
He has tended to gravitate to several identifiable landscapes to which he has returned repeatedly over a period of decades. He typically begins a painting with a sketch on canvas in pencil followed by a loose brushed wash before executing a finished painting with acrylic paint in washes, drybrush and numerous layers of color. His works have fetched increasingly higher prices with his growing fame, and today Bell's major works sell at an excess of ten thousand dollars from private dealers and at auction. Though the female nude is a classic subject, much of EC Bell's struggle as an artist has been combating narrow-minded attitudes towards erotic art. Bell's delicate approach to the female nude as well as his mastery of form has changed many minds.

He lives and works in the art mecca of San Miguel de Allende, Mexico.

Exhibitions
1964–1967
Amsterdam & in Vogelweh and
Kaiserslautern, Germany (solo)
1967–1969
Wrightville Beach, NC (solo and group)
1968 St. Johns Gallery, Wilmington (solo)
1968 Southport, NC (Solo)
1969 Wilmington Art Gallery, NC (solo)
1987 Jan Goin Gallery, Charleston (group)
1988–1990
Wexford Gallery
Hilton Head, SC (Group)
1989 Exhibition Curated by Leo Twigs,	Berkeley, SC (group)
1992 Charleston Art Trading Company (featured artist)
1992–1995 New Life Art, Charleston, SC (solo and group shows)
1993–1996 Greenwood Museum, SC
1998 McCormick Museum, SC, Sponsored by SCArts Commission
2000–2004 CrazyHorse Art Gallery, Charleston, SC (solo)
2004 Exhibition Curated by Brenda Cook, NYC (group)
2004–2007 Owned and Showed at the Belle Muse Art Gallery and EC Bell Fine Art, Charleston, SC (solo and group)
2005 Different Artists, Different Mediums Curated by Brenda Cook, West Ashley, SC (group)
2007 Galeria Aspen, Guanajuato, Mexico, (featured artist)

Curatorial projects
Annual Erotic Art Invitational, Belle Muse Art Gallery, Spoleto Festival USA, Charleston, SC 2003–2006
Over 60 shows 2002–2007 at galleries owned by EC Bell to support new artist

Collections
 Berkeley County Courthouse, South Carolina
 Wilmington Board of Education
 Jewish Community Center, Charleston, SC
 Private Collections in the US, Canada, France, Poland, the Netherlands, Germany, Ireland, England, Venezuela, Columbia, Mexico & Puerto Rico.

References

External links
Artist's myspace

20th-century American painters
American male painters
21st-century American painters
Living people
1946 births
Expressionist painters
20th-century American male artists